The 2023 Cup of Nations was the second edition of the Cup of Nations, an international women's football tournament. It was held in Gosford, Sydney and Newcastle, Australia from 16 to 22 February 2023, and featured four teams.

Australia won the title for the second time.

Format
The four invited teams played a round-robin tournament. Points awarded in the group stage followed the formula of three points for a win, one point for a draw, and zero points for a loss. A tie in points was decided by goal differential.

Teams

Squads

Venues
Three cities were used as venues for the tournament.

Standings

Matches

Goalscorers

References

2023 Cup of Nations
2022–23 in Australian women's soccer
2023 in women's association football
February 2023 sports events in Australia
Cup of Nations (Australia)